During NASA's Space Shuttle program, several missions were canceled. Many were canceled as a result of the Challenger and the Columbia disasters or due to delays in the development of the shuttle. Others were canceled because of changes in payload and mission requirements.

Canceled due to the late development of the Space Shuttle 
In 1972, NASA's planners had projected for 570 Space Shuttle missions between 1980 and 1991. Later, this estimate was lowered to 487 launches between 1980 and 1992. The details of the first 23 projected missions, listed in the third edition of Manned Spaceflight (Reginald Turnill, 1978) and the first edition of the STS Flight Assignment Baseline, an internal NASA document published in October 1977, are presented below.

Later in the development process, NASA suggested using the first manned Space Shuttle mission, STS-1, as a sub-orbital test of the Return to Launch Site (RTLS) flight profile devised for emergency abort scenarios. The mission was canceled when astronauts refused to fly it, having deemed the plan to be too dangerous. STS-1 commander John W. Young recalled that "I said no. I said let's not practice Russian roulette, because you may have a loaded gun there. So we didn't."

Canceled between the first flight of the Space Shuttle (1981) and the Challenger disaster (1986)

Canceled due to the Challenger disaster

Canceled between 1988 and the Columbia disaster (2003)

Canceled due to the Columbia disaster

References 

 
Space Shuttle program
Space Shuttle